John H. Long is a Canadian political figure. He has sought election to the House of Commons of Canada and the Legislative Assembly of Ontario on five occasions and has run for the leadership of the Social Credit Party of Canada, the Progressive Conservative Party of Canada, and the Canadian Alliance. He is strongly influenced by social credit economic theories and has often called for reform of the Bank of Canada.

Early candidacies
Long first sought election to the Canadian House of Commons in 1974, when he ran as a Social Credit candidate in Waterloo—Cambridge. He sought the party's leadership two years later, following the resignation of Réal Caouette. Long received thirty-one votes out of 1,143 on the first ballot and withdrew from the contest before the second round. A Montreal Gazette article from this period described him as manufacturer based in Cambridge, Ontario.

He ran for Cambridge in the 1977 Ontario provincial election, appearing on the ballot as an independent candidate. He was presumably still aligned at this time with the federal Social Credit Party, which did not have a provincial affiliate in Ontario. (The official provincial wing of the party had previously been taken over by a group of neo-Nazis, to which Long had no connection.)

Long joined the Liberal Party of Canada in the 1980s and ran for delegate status at the party's 1984 leadership convention. The Cambridge branch of the party subsequently expelled him, saying that he had tried to recruit new members to support a "fusion" candidate who would be supported by both the Liberals and the New Democratic Party. (This initiative was undertaken without support from either party.) Long later sought the Progressive Conservative nomination in Cambridge for the 1988 federal election.

Long also ran mayor of Cambridge in 1985.

1990s campaigns
Long campaigned for the leadership of the Progressive Conservative Party of Canada in 1993, following the resignation of Brian Mulroney. He promoted monetary reform, called for an end to official bilingualism in Canada, and said that he wanted to succeed John Crow as governor of the Bank of Canada. Considered a fringe candidate, he nonetheless appeared at a public debate in Montreal with Kim Campbell, Jean Charest, and other contenders. He received no delegate support and withdrew from the contest before the party's convention. He later sought the Progressive Conservative nomination in Waterloo for the 1993 federal election but received only two votes.

Long then ran for Guelph—Wellington in the 1993 election as a candidate of the Canada Party, an ideological successor to Social Credit. He was sixty years old at the time and lived in Guelph.

He wanted to seek the Reform Party nomination for a 1995 by-election in Brome—Missisquoi, Quebec but his candidacy was rejected by the party. He instead ran as a candidate of John Turmel's Abolitionist Party (another ideological successor to Social Credit) and finished a distant last in a field of ten candidates. He later ran as an independent candidate in Cambridge in the 1997 federal election.

Long supported the Progressive Conservative Party of Ontario in the 1995 provincial election. He later criticized party leader Mike Harris and described the party's "Common Sense Revolution" as having been a "big bank revolution."

Long was the first declared candidate in the Progressive Conservative Party of Canada's 1998 leadership election. He supported a merger of the Progressive Conservative and Reform parties, favoured bank mergers, and said that the Bank of Canada should set up reserve banks that would leave one hundred per cent of their deposit liabilities with the central bank. He also opposed the Canada-United States Free Trade Agreement and sought to peg the Canadian dollar at sixty-eight cents relative to the American dollar. During this contest, Long described himself as a "product developer, mechanical engineer, environmentalist and homespun economist." He withdrew from the campaign in July 1998, before voting took place.

Long later sought the leadership of the Canadian Alliance in 2000, describing himself as a populist and calling for more plebiscites on controversial issues. Describing right wing and left wing labels as passé, he referred to himself as "an ultra-right-wing libertarian with a great, big, bushy socialist tail." He once again withdrew from the contest before voting took place.

He sought the Progressive Conservative nomination in Bruce—Grey—Owen Sound for the 2000 federal election, but was not given a response by the party. Long reserved the rights to the name, "The Common Sense People's Party of Ontario," with Elections Ontario in 2002, but he did not seek election under the party name. He does not appear to have been active in politics since this time.

IMICO and Kanmet controversies
In 1992, Long purchased an abandoned IMICO foundry in Guelph for one dollar. The foundry's previous owners had fled the country, leaving behind a company that was over one million dollars in debt.

One year after buying the property, Long was informed by the Ontario Ministry of Environment and Energy that he would be required to clean up toxic wastes at the site. The cost was estimated at half a million dollars. Long described the charge as politically motivated, said that the site was not producing new contaminants, and refused to pay.

On December 31, 1993, Long transferred ownership of the site to the Assembly of the Church of the Universe, a religious sect based in Hamilton devoted to nudism and sacramental marijuana use. He argued that he was no longer responsible for the property after the transfer, although the ministry disagreed. In 1997, he was fined ten thousand dollars for an environmental offense.

Long also purchased an abandoned Kanmet Castings foundry in Cambridge for one dollar during the same period. In January 1996, he was sentenced to three months in jail and fined seventy-two thousand dollars for the improper storage of PCBs on the site. This controversy took place during the 1997 election.

The Assembly of the Church of the Universe moved its headquarters from the IMICO foundry in Guelph to the Kanmet foundry in Cambridge in 1998, with Long's permission. The city of Cambridge later tried to evict the church from the foundry, without success. In late 1998, the city reluctantly purchased the foundry from Long for fifty-eight thousand dollars and forgave him nine hundred thousand dollars in back taxes and hydro expenses. The church was forced to leave the Cambridge area shortly thereafter.

Long has also served time in prison for infractions of Ontario's Highway Traffic Act and for refusing to pay a fine for improper labour practices, and he has been fined for evading payment of the retail sales tax. When asked about his convictions in 2000, he said, "I'm not a criminal. I'm a firm believer in civil disobedience. I'm like Mahatma Gandhi in that regard."

Electoral record
Federal

Provincial

References

Abolitionist Party of Canada candidates for the Canadian House of Commons
Canada Party candidates for the Canadian House of Commons
Independent candidates for the Canadian House of Commons
Independent candidates in Ontario provincial elections
Possibly living people
Social Credit Party of Canada candidates for the Canadian House of Commons